Geri Doveji (also Romanized as Gerī Dovejī; also known as Gerī) is a village in Sheykh Musa Rural District, in the Central District of Aqqala County, Golestan Province, Iran. At the 2006 census, its population was 2,331, in 451 families.

References 

Populated places in Aqqala County